Perła (meaning Pearl) is the third studio album by Polish singer Edyta Górniak, released in Poland on 11 March 2002, via Pomaton EMI. On 24 February 2003, a special edition of Perła was released in Poland with new songs and remixes. On 31 March 2003, the album was retitled Invisible and released internationally by Virgin Records. Songs were mainly written and produced by Absolute. Perła reached number one in Poland and was certified gold.

Polish editions 
In Poland, Perła was originally released as a two-CD set, with Polish-language songs on the first disc, and English-language tracks on the second disc. Most English songs were written by Tracy Ackerman, Andy Watkins and Paul Wilson, and produced by a British music production team Absolute. Górniak also recorded Polish versions of "The Story So Far" and "The Day Before the Rain", titled "Perła" and "Słowa jak motyle", respectively.

One year later, Perła was re-released as a special edition with new songs and remixes. The first CD featured ballads, and the second-one uptempo songs. The new tracks included Absolute-produced international single "Impossible" and "Talk to Me", and also "Calling You" and "Don't You Know You" produced by Andy Duncan. The album also included remixes of "Impossible" and "Perła", and an extended version of "Sleep with Me". "Cross My Heart" was retitled "X My Heart". However, four songs were excluded from the re-released album: "If You Could", "The Day Before the Rain", "Prezenty" and the original version of "Perła".

Track listing 

Notes
  signifies an additional producer
  signifies an executive producer

Charts

Certifications

International edition 

Perła was retitled Invisible and released internatinally on 31 March 2003, via Virgin Records. It included songs already released on Perła and the new single "Impossible", which entered the charts in Germany, Austria and Switzerland.

Track listing 

Notes
  signifies an additional producer
  signifies an executive producer

Release history

References 

Edyta Górniak albums
2002 albums
2003 albums